Jo is a French comedy film, originally released in 1971. It is known in English-language territories either as Joe: The Busy Body or The Gazebo. It was directed by Jean Girault and stars Louis de Funès as playwright Antoine Brisebard, Claude Gensac as an actress and his wife Sylvie Brisebard as well Bernard Blier as inspector Ducros.

The script is based on a play by Alec Coppel, published in 1958, The Gazebo. Jo is its second adaptation, the first one being the 1959 film The Gazebo, starring Glenn Ford and Debbie Reynolds.

Synopsis
Antoine Brisebard, a famous comedy playwright, is struggling with financial difficulties and is preparing to sell his country villa to an English couple. What no one knows, however, is that Brisebard is actually a victim of blackmail since his wife Sylvie, a famous actress, is the daughter of a notorious robber-murderer. His extortionist is a malevolent criminal only known as Jo, who visits him often to pick up his hush money. But faced with certain ruin, Brisebard is preparing to do away with Jo once and for all, planning his deed under the guise of him trying to write the script for a crime play and consulting his friend, attorney Colas, for ideas of how to efficiently get rid of the body. He finally takes up the offer of garden landscaper Tonelotti to erect a pavilion, whose foundation would provide the ideal hiding place for the corpse.

On the night Jo is scheduled to arrive for his next payment, Brisebard awaits the arrival with a gun, but is not able to pull the trigger and drops the gun to the floor, which results in a shot going off and accidentally killing Jo. But it is only then that things turn really difficult: Police inspector Ducros, who has found out about Jo's operation and Brisebard's involvement in it, starts nosing around, telling Brisebard that Jo had already been murdered at the time he was supposed to come to the villa - the man Brisebard shot is eventually revealed as Riri, Jo's criminal associate and murderer. The pavillon foundation proves to be too shoddy, forcing Brisebard to hide the body elsewhere; a lot of unwanted houseguests keep coming and going; and finally, Riri's body stubbornly refuses to remain hidden. Even with the help of his wife, to whom he finally tells everything, the task of getting rid of the body becomes an outright daunting – and nerve-wracking – one.

Cast

Reception 
Following its release, the film sold 2,466,966 tickets in France. It was the 13th most successful film in France in 1971, far behind The Aristocats, at the top of the box office with 12,481,726 tickets sold in the country. Jo was a small success for Louis de Funès, whose films usually attracted large popular interest. Most of the critics praised the performance of Louis de Funès but deplored the weak direction of Jean Girault, who admitted that de Funès was responsible for 60% of the gags used in the film.

References

External links

 

1970s French-language films
1971 films
1970s black comedy films
Films directed by Jean Girault
French black comedy films
French remakes of American films
French films based on plays
1971 comedy films
1971 drama films
1970s French films